Brian Joseph McCook, known by his drag persona Yekaterina Petrovna Zamolodchikova, or mononymously as Katya, is an American drag queen, actor, author, recording artist, and comedian.  is best known for placing fifth on the seventh season of RuPaul's Drag Race and placing as a runner-up on the second season of RuPaul's Drag Race All Stars, as well as for appearing in the World of Wonder web series UNHhhh and the Viceland series The Trixie & Katya Show with co-host and fellow season 7 alum Trixie Mattel. Trixie and Katya often appear together as a popular comedy duo.

Early life and education 
McCook was born to Pat McCook (born December 10, 1956), is of Irish descent and was raised in a Catholic household with an older brother and a younger sister. McCook was raised in Marlborough, Massachusetts and graduated from Marlborough High School in 2000. In a 2019 interview, McCook described growing up as "boring, nondescript, [and] a boiler-plate white suburb". He then attended Boston University for one year before transferring to Massachusetts College of Art and Design, where he studied video and performance art in the Studio for Interrelated Media (SIM) program with a minor in psychology, and first became interested in drag.

Career

Early drag career 
McCook created the Russian drag character  in 2006, taking the stage name from a combination of Russian names and one of his favorite gymnasts, . When creating his drag character, McCook stated that he was inspired by "female comedians and just funny interesting women like Tracy Ullman, Maria Bamford, Lana Del Rey [and] Amy Sedaris." McCook stated on Drag Race that the Russian-based aspect of his persona was inspired by a professor he had while studying at the Massachusetts College of Art and Design, who "never left the house without a full face of makeup [with] six inch stilettos in the snow." McCook is not of Russian descent himself, but took several Russian language courses and used a cassette tape called "Pronounce It Perfectly" to master the accent. In addition to speaking Russian, he can also speak fluent French and is known to speak Japanese and Portuguese.

As Katya, McCook hosted a monthly drag show called "Perestroika" at the Jacques Cabaret. Katya became known on the local drag scene in Boston for performing songs by popular Russian artists such as Alla Pugacheva, t.A.T.u. and Glukoza.

RuPaul's Drag Race
Katya auditioned for RuPaul's Drag Race on Logo TV four times before being chosen to participate in season 7. She is seen auditioning for the show back in Season 3's Casting Extravaganza. She won two challenges before being eliminated in episode 11, finishing in fifth place after losing a lip-sync against Kennedy Davenport. The decision to eliminate her was controversial, as she was popular among viewers. During the Season 7 reunion, she was voted Miss Congeniality by fans. On May 16, 2016, Katya appeared at the finale of RuPaul's Drag Race Season 8 to crown the next Miss Congeniality: Cynthia Lee Fontaine. On June 17, 2016, Katya was announced as one of the cast members on the second season of RuPaul's Drag Race: All Stars. She placed in the top three times throughout the season, and eventually finished as a runner-up along with fellow contestant Detox.

Other projects

Katya has uploaded several web series on her YouTube channel, "welovekatya", including RuGRETs, RuFLECTIONS, Drag 101, Total RuCall, and Irregardlessly Trish, the last of which is about a Bostonian hairdresser who lives in a dumpster. Katya improvises some of her material and also writes with a creative partner, Avi Paul Weinstein.

In November 2015, Katya appeared on the Christmas Queens album, singing a modified version of the song "12 Days of Christmas". Katya also features in Trixie Mattel's album Homemade Christmas in the song "The Night Before Contact".

Along with fellow Drag Race contestant Trixie Mattel, Katya co-hosts a web series on the World of Wonder YouTube channel called UNHhhh, which debuted in March 2016. On August 21, 2017, it was announced that Katya and Mattel would have their own show on Viceland, titled The Trixie & Katya Show, which premiered on November 15, 2017.

Katya had a role in the 2018 film Hurricane Bianca 2: From Russia With Hate, directed by Matt Kugelman and starring Bianca del Rio in the lead role. In 2018, Katya co-hosted a podcast called Whimsically Volatile with Craig MacNeil. In November 2019, it was announced on the podcast that Katya will be leaving the show. In the fall of 2018, Katya and Mattel revitalized their web series UNHhhh on WOWPresents Plus as well as YouTube due to the overall popularity and success of the show.

In the spring of 2019, Katya announced her touring comedy show, "Help Me, I'm Dying". The tour was filmed for a comedy special of the same name that aired on OutTV in Canada in October 2019. It was available on demand in February 2020 and aired on Logo TV on March 4, 2020. In November 2019, Katya and Mattel cohosted a new show on the Netflix YouTube channel called I Like to Watch where they react to various shows on Netflix. In June 2019, a panel of judges from New York magazine placed  13th on their list of "the most powerful drag queens in America", a ranking of 100 former Drag Race contestants.

She released her first book, Trixie and Katya's Guide to Modern Womanhood, on July 14, 2020. Published by Plume Books, it was co-written with fellow Drag Race contestant Mattel, debuting at number two on The New York Times Best Seller list for "Advice, How-To, and Miscellaneous".

In 2020, Katya and co-host Trixie Mattel launched the weekly podcast "The Bald and The Beautiful." In October Katya confirmed she would release her debut EP Vampire Fitness on November 13. In December, it was announced that Katya and Mattel would co-host the 10th Streamy Awards in Los Angeles.

In August 2021, Katya and Mattel launched a Substack advice newsletter, Gooped, which ran until July 2022.

Personal life
Returning to Twitter in March 2018, McCook announced that the tour would likely be renamed due to his recovery.

In the first episode of Whimsically Volatile in March 2018, McCook discussed the hiatus in detail. He described suffering a psychotic break after a methamphetamine relapse and briefly returning to live with his family in Massachusetts before entering a rehabilitation center in Arizona.

On an episode titled "Time....Again" from season 7 of UNHhhh Katya shared that she had gotten her tattoos during a manic episode while on drugs but that she did not regret getting them.

Filmography

Television

Web series
{| class="wikitable sortable"
|-
! Year
! Title
! Role
! class="unsortable" | Notes
! 
|-
| rowspan="6" |2015
| RuFLECTIONS
| rowspan="2" |Herself (in drag)
| rowspan="2" |Chronicling her time on RuPaul's Drag Race season 7
| 
|-
| RuGRETS
| 
|-
| Irregardlessly Trish
|Trish
|Series following one of her alter-egos, Trish
| 
|-
| Bestie$ for Ca$h
|Herself (in drag)
|1 episode
| 
|-
| Transformations
|Herself (out of drag)
|1 episode
| 
|-
| Fashion Photo RuView
|Herself (in drag)
|Guest co-host for one episode (with Trixie Mattel)
| 
|-
|2015-2016
| Whatcha Packin'''
|Herself (out of drag)
|2 episodes
|
|-
|rowspan="3"|2016
| I'm Not a Doctor, with Dr. Katya|rowspan="4"|Herself (in drag)
|Produced by World of Wonder
| 
|-
| Drag 101|
| 
|-
| Total RuCall| Chronicling her time on RuPaul's All Stars Drag Race season 2
| 
|-
| 2016-2017
|Hey Qween!| 2 episodes
|-
|2016–present
| UNHhhh|Herself (co-host in drag)
|Produced by World of Wonder, with Trixie Mattel
| 
|-
|2017
| Painted by Fame|Herself (out of drag)
|1 episode
| 
|-
|2017, 2019-2022
|The Pit Stop|rowspan="2"|Herself (in drag)
|6 episodes
|
|-
|2018
| Fashion Photo RuView| Guest co-host for four episodes (with Violet Chachki)
| 
|-
| rowspan="2" |2019
| Exposed| Herself (in drag)
|1 episode
| 
|-
| Runway Rewind|Herself (in drag)
|Guest co-host for four episodes (with Violet Chachki)
|
|-
|2019–present
|I Like to Watch|rowspan="3"|Herself (co-host in drag)
|Produced by Netflix, with Trixie Mattel
|
|-
| rowspan="2" |2020
|Trixie and Katya Save the World|Produced by World of Wonder
|
|-
|10th Annual Streamy Awards|Co-host in drag with Trixie Mattel, aired on YouTube
|
|-
| 2021
|Out of the Closet|Herself (out of drag)
|1 episode
|
|-
| 2022
|Good for You|Herself (in drag)
|1 episode
|
|-
| rowspan="2" |2023
|Sissy That Talk Show|Herself (in drag)
|1 episode
|
|-
|Sissy That Talk Show/The After Show Podcast|Herself (in drag)
|1 episode
|
|}

Film

Podcast series

Music videos

Discography
 Extended plays 

 Singles 
As lead artist

As featured artist

Guest appearances

Awards and nominations

Bibliography
 Trixie and Katya's Guide to Modern Womanhood. Plume. 2020. .
 Working Girls: Trixie and Katya's Guide to Professional Womanhood''. Plume. 2022. .

References

External links

 Official website for Katya
 

Living people
American drag queens
American people of Irish descent
People from Boston
Katya Zamolodchikova
Katya Zamolodchikova
LGBT people from Massachusetts
American gay actors
Gay comedians
American gay musicians
American gay writers
20th-century American LGBT people
21st-century American LGBT people
Webby Award winners
Streamy Award winners
Year of birth missing (living people)
American LGBT comedians